Carpology is a discipline of botany devoted to the study of seeds and fruits. The German inventor Joseph Gaertner, a doctor and botanist who lived in the 18th century and  dedicated his life to the study of natural history, is considered its inventor. When the discipline is applied to archaeological remains, it is known as paleocarpology, which in turn is located within paleobotanical science.

Carpology would have, finally, from the results obtained from the study of the fruits and seeds obtained in one place, two objectives: the first, to reconstruct the evolution of a certain plant species; and, the second, to recreate what the landscape was like and, therefore, its flora and fauna.

For the data that this discipline is capable of obtaining, it is considered "auxiliary" for others such as archeology. Among other things, carpology can distinguish between indigenous seeds of an area and those that have been domesticated for human cultivation. From here, a reconstruction of the landscape flora can be extrapolated, always bearing in mind how destructive anthropic action is.

Currently there are numerous research centers with carpology departments. France, the United Kingdom, the Netherlands, Belgium or Germany are the European states with the longest history of this discipline. Despite this, there are also teams and personnel dedicated to carpology in Spain or Italy. It is an expanding science.

Currently, many of these teams are carrying out research work in different places such as Syria, Lebanon, Algeria, or Tunisia. These works linked to archeology with very satisfactory results in terms of the recovered carpological materials, ruin the ancient theories that affirmed that it was a science limited to wetlands due to conservation.

References 

 ALONSO i MARTINEZ, N., De la llavor a la farina: els processos agrícoles protohistòrics a la Catalunya occidental, Monographies d'archéologie méditerranéenne 4, Lattes, Association pour la recherche archéologique en Languedoc oriental, 1999
 BUXÓ, R. y PIQUÉ, R., La recogida de muestras en arqueobotánica: objetivos y propuestas metodológicas, Museu d’Arqueologia de Catalunya, Barcelona, 2003.
 BUXÓ, R., Arqueología de las plantas. La explotación económica de las semillas las frutas en el marco mediterráneo de la Península Ibérica, Crítica, Barcelona, 1997.
 BUXÓ, R; MOLIST, M. (dir.), From the adoption of Agriculture to the Current Landscape: long term interaction between Men and Environment in the East Mediterranean Basin, European project ICA3-CT-2002-10022, Monografies 9, Museu d’Arqueologia de Catalunya, Barcelona, 2007
 DURAND, A., Les paysages médiévaux de Languedoc (Xe-XIIe siècles), Toulouse, Presses universitaires du Mirail, 1998

Branches of botany
Methods in archaeology